The 1932–33 Ohio Bobcats men's basketball team represented Ohio University. Butch Grover was the head coach for Ohio. The Bobcats played their home games at the Men's Gymnasium.  They finished the season 16–4 and won their second Buckeye Athletic Association championship with a record of 7–3.

Schedule

|-
!colspan=9 style=| Regular Season

Source:

References

Ohio Bobcats men's basketball seasons
Ohio
Ohio Bobcats
Ohio Bobcats